Aboubakar Koné (born 3 July 1990) is a French professional footballer who plays as a forward for Đà Nẵng.

Career
In 2014, Koné signed for English side Hereford United, but left due to them going bankrupt. In 2015, he signed for  Aurillac in the French fifth tier. In 2017, he signed for French third tier club Chambly. Before the second half of 2019–20, Koné signed for Chamalières in the French fourth tier. Before the 2022 season, he signed for Vietnamese team Đà Nẵng. On 27 February 2022, he debuted for Đà Nẵng during a 2–2 draw with Sài Gòn FC.

References

External links
 

Living people
1990 births
French footballers
Association football forwards
Championnat National players
Championnat National 2 players
Championnat National 3 players
Southern Football League players
V.League 1 players
UJA Maccabi Paris Métropole players
Hereford United F.C. players
FC Aurillac Arpajon Cantal Auvergne players
FC Chambly Oise players
JA Drancy players
Canet Roussillon FC players
FC Chamalières players
SHB Da Nang FC players
French expatriate footballers
French expatriate sportspeople in England
Expatriate footballers in England
French expatriate sportspeople in Vietnam
Expatriate footballers in Vietnam